The 2014–15 Håndboldligaen (known as the Boxer Herreligaen for sponsorship reasons) is the 79th season of the Håndboldligaen, Denmark's premier Handball league.

Team information 

The following 14 clubs compete in the Håndboldligaen during the 2014–15 season:

Personnel and kits
Following is the list of clubs competing in 2014–15 Håndboldligaen, with their manager, captain, kit manufacturer and shirt sponsor.

Regular season

Standings

Pld - Played; W - Won; L - Lost; GF - Goals for; GA - Goals against; Diff - Difference; Pts - Points.

! There's a new relegation playoff made in November 2014

Schedule and results
In the table below the home teams are listed on the left and the away teams along the top.

No .1-8 from the regular season divided into two groups with the top two will advance to the semifinals

Group 1

Group 2

Semifinal

3rd place
Highest ranking team in the regular season plays at home in the second match.

Final
Highest ranking team in the regular season plays at home in the second match.

Relegation playoff
No. 12-13 from Håndboldligaen and no. 2-3 from the first division is meet each other for the last 2 seats. The winner stays in the league. the loser relegated to Division 1

Group 1

Group 2

Number of teams by regions

Top goalscorers
Statistics.

All Star Team
Goalkeeper:  Sebastian Frandsen (REHH)
Left Wing:  Søren Nørgård (LTH)
Left Back:  Michael Damgaard (THH)
Centre Back:  Sebastian Skube (BSV)
Pivot:  Cyril Viudes (KIF)
Right Back:  Nikolaj Ø. Nielsen (BSV)
Right Wing:  Patrick Wiesmach Larsen (THH)

References

External links
 Danish Handball Federaration 

2014–15 domestic handball leagues
Handboldligaen
Handboldligaen
Handball competitions in Denmark